The TI-55 is a programmable calculator first manufactured by Texas Instruments in 1977. It has an LED display, and weighs 6.4 ounces (180 grams). It is programmable to hold up to 32 key-codes that allow the user to repeat simple calculations with different values.

Variants

TI-55 II
The TI-55 II with LCD was introduced in 1981, but, like many other Texas Instruments calculators of this time, suffered from serious keyboard reliability problems. Several variants of the TI-55 II exist.

TI-55 III
The TI-55 III replaced the TI-55 II in the USA in 1986. It features redesigned keyboard mechanics, thereby eliminating the common "bouncing keys" fault of prior models. Several variants of the TI-55 III exist.

TI-56
The TI-56 is a European variant of the TI-55 manufactured since 1976.

The SR-56 uses the TMC0501 scalable calculator architecture 
like the SR-50, SR-51 and SR-52. The TI SR-56 was followed shortly by the TI 57 which is similar in many ways but can not be connected to the PC-100 printer.

Date of introduction:  May 21, 1976 
Display technology: LED 10 + 2
Size:  5.8" x 3.:;2" x 1.3"  147 x 81 x 32 mm. 
Weight:  8.5 ounces, 240 grams 
Jmm
Manufacturer: Texas Instrumentsr

References

External links
TI-55 II user manual

Texas Instruments programmable calculators